"King's Lead Hat" is a song written by Brian Eno, released in 1977 as the fifth track from his album Before and After Science. The title is an anagram of "Talking Heads". In 1978 a remixed version of the song was released as a single.

Rock critic Lester Bangs described the song "King's Lead Hat" as a track that emphasises "Eno's affinities with new wave in its rushed mechanical rhythms". Eno would later produce Talking Heads' second, third and fourth albums, including Remain in Light (1980).

B-side 
"R.A.F.", a collaboration with Snatch, is a standalone track that uses samples of Baader-Meinhoff terrorists recorded from a German telephone announcement. R.A.F. stands for "Red Army Faction".

Cover versions
 1980 – Ultravox

References

1977 songs
Brian Eno songs
British new wave songs
Songs written by Brian Eno
Talking Heads
Anagrams